Brockway is a community in the Canadian province of York County, New Brunswick.

History

Notable people

See also
List of communities in New Brunswick

References

Communities in York County, New Brunswick